The Isle of Illusion is a children's fantasy book by Emily Rodda. It was published in 2002 by Scholastic. It is the second book in the Deltora Quest 2 series, the second series in the collective Deltora Quest series. It is preceded by Cavern of the Fear and followed by The Shadowlands.

Summary
The Isle of Illusion continues where Cavern of the Fear left off. Lief, Barda and Jasmine resume their quest to reunite the three pieces of the fabled Pirran Pipe. They must collect the middle piece of the pipe from the Auron tribe.

See also

Deltora Quest series

References

External links
Official American Deltora website
Emily Rodda official website
The Isle of Illusion at Goodreads
The Isle of Illusion at Google Books

Australian children's novels
Australian fantasy novels
Children's books set in subterranea
Deltora
2002 fantasy novels
2002 Australian novels
2002 children's books